Harry Ryan may refer to:

 Harry Ryan (cyclist) (1893–1961), British track cycling racer
 Harry Ryan (hurler) (born 1957), Irish retired hurler
 Harry Ryan (American football) (died 1953), early professional American football player

See also
Harold Ryan (disambiguation)
Henry Ryan (disambiguation)